Hawaa Al Thahak Al Mansoori is an Emirati physician, inventor and politician. She was appointed to the Federal National Council of the United Arab Emirates in 2019. As a physician Dr. Al Mansoori is an endocrinologist and healthcare executive, serving as executive director of the Intramural Research Division at the Abu Dhabi Stem Cell Center and Deputy Medical Director of Imperial College London Diabetes Centre in Abu Dhabi.

Al Mansoori is on the board of Sandooq Al Watan, a charitable foundation launched by a group of Emirati business people. She has been an advocate of sustainable healthcare, genetic medicine and women's empowerment. In 2014 she was presented the UAE Pioneers Award by the Prime Minister of the UAE for her invention of a catheter placement technology. She is a named inventor on three US patents, and a published academic.

Education 
Al Mansoori was the first Emirati woman to be awarded a UAE Presidential Scholarship to study medicine in the United States. She completed her undergraduate studies at the University of Maryland, receiving a BSc in Neurobiology & Physiology and a BSc in Psychology.

In 2001 Al Mansoori was awarded a medical research fellowship by the Howard Hughes Medical Institute, during which she worked as an assistant to Sarah Tishkoff and undertook research projects focused on population genetics and rare diseases including Familial Mediterranean Fever. Her research has been published in peer-reviewed journals including the American Journal of Gastroenterology and the journal of the American Diabetes Association (see ).

On earning her Doctor of Medicine (MD)  Al Mansoori became the first non-American woman to graduate from George Washington University School of Medicine, where she then went on to complete both her residency and fellowship. In 2013 she became double board certified in Internal Medicine and Endocrinology.

In 2013 on completion of her studies Dr Al Mansoori moved back to the UAE. She was presented at the 2014 World Government Summit by Deputy Prime Minister, Sheikh Mansour Bin Zayed Al Nahyan as an example of success in education and innovation.

Career 
Since beginning her career as a consultant endocrinologist, Al Mansoori has worked in various healthcare related positions across the public and private sectors. She entered politics on being appointed to the Federal National Council.

Healthcare 
Al Mansoori is chairman and co-founder of SonoStik LLC, a company created to develop vascular access technologies based on a design conceived during her medical studies. In June 2021 SonoStik completed raising its series A funding round led by DisruptAD, the venture capital platform of investment firm ADQ.

Since 2016 she has been the Deputy Medical Director of Imperial College London Diabetes Centre in Abu Dhabi, the capital's largest outpatient facility by patient volume. Since 2014 she has been practicing as a consultant endocrinologist both at ICLDC and at Cleveland Clinic Abu Dhabi.

Al Mansoori is the executive director of Intramural Research at Abu Dhabi Stem Cell Center (ADSCC), where she is leading collaborations and research initiatives including a project to explore potential cures for Type 1 diabetes. In May 2021 Sheikh Mohamed bin Zayed, Crown Prince of Abu Dhabi, visited the center to announce the development of a new medical research campus and stated that, "their inspiring work is a key part of UAE efforts to offer medical expertise to help eradicate diseases and support human development worldwide." 

In November 2021 Al Mansoori was part of a delegation from ADSCC which visited the Zayed Center for Research in Rare Diseases in Children, a UAE-funded specialist research and treatment centre linked with Great Ormond Street Hospital (GOSH). The two institutions hosted a workshop and discussed potential for cooperation in areas such as rare diseases, gene therapy and regenerative medicine.

In December 2021 it was announced that Al Mansouri had signed a Letter Of Intent on behalf of the Abu Dhabi Stem Cell Center with the United States National Institute of Allergy and Infectious Diseases (NIAID), which is part of the National Institute of Health (NIH). The collaborative research anticipated under this LOI is intended to serve as a basis for subsequent research partnerships that could respond to unique scientific opportunities available between the UAE and the United States. Speaking at the announcement ceremony, Al Mansoori remarked, "As a country we pride ourselves with the legacy we inherited from our forefathers who built this great nation 50 years ago ... It is our duty to continue the journey for the next 50 years ... One way we can play a part is to leverage new relationships and innovative collaborations to accelerate progress ... Our partnership [with NIAID] has the potential to deliver transformative breakthroughs for diseases like diabetes which can improve the lives of millions of people." 

During a visit to Abu Dhabi Stem Cell Center, Dr Tedros Ghebreyesus, Director-General of the World Health Organization (WHO), discussed the announced Letter of Intent with the United States NIH, and potential future collaborations including ADSCC aims to become the WHO’s first collaborating centre in the Middle East.

Politics 
In November 2018 Al Mansoori was appointed to the Federal National Council (FNC) of the United Arab Emirates as a representative of Abu Dhabi. She has led discussions on policy and reviews of proposed laws in several areas including healthcare, enterprise, sustainability, education, legislative affairs, and equality. During the COVID-19 pandemic she expressed support for a government initiative to grant physicians and their families 10-year residency visas.

Other roles 
In November 2016 Al Mansoori served as master of ceremonies at the Launch of the UAE/UK 2017 Year of Creative Collaboration, presenting to an audience including King Charles III and Camilla, Queen Consort.

Al Mansoori has been a board member of Sandooq Al Watan since January 2020 and serves on its executive committee. She has also been involved in initiatives to promote STEM education, empower women, and encourage enterprise by Emirati youth. Since 2019 she has featured in the Abu Dhabi Find Wonder campaign: Dr Hawaa Al Mansouri: Female leaders in science and medical technology.

She has been a participant in forums both in the UAE and internationally as a speaker, moderator and Master of ceremonies. These include:

 'How Will We Thrive?' Summit at Expo 2020 organized by the UK Department for International Trade. Chair of panel titled, "Empowering People: Better Health and Care with Technology".
 Expo 2020, "Building Bridges for a Global Future" organized by Forum 2000 and the Czech Pavilion. Panelist with Rabbi Elie Abadie and Tomáš Halík.
 Milken Institute Global Conference 2019:  Panelist with Randy Jackson of session, “Diabetes and Obesity: An Urgent Global Health Crisis”.
 Milken Institute MENA Summit 2019: Speaker & Panelist with Sumit Jamuar of session, “The Cost of Chronic Disease and the Future of Treatment”.
 4th International Conference of Sports for Women - An initiative of the Fatima bint Mubarak Ladies Sport Academy, Speaker.
 Second Aqdar World Summit, 2018: Moderator of the first session, “Sheikh Zayed Strategies on Empowering People”.
 World Economic Forum, Annual Meeting of Global Future Councils 2018: Moderator of session, "Human Augmentation" at the Innovation Summit.
 Majlis Mohamed bin Zayed Ramadan Lecture: Moderator of session with Dimitri Christakis titled, "How early experiences affect brain".
SALT Abu Dhabi 2019: Panelist for session titled, "Identifying and Creating the Next Healthcare Innovations".

Awards and honors 

 1999: Presidential Scholarship to study medicine in the United States. First Emirati to be receive this award.
2014: UAE Pioneers Award, received from UAE Prime Minister, Sheikh Mohammed bin Rashid Al Maktoum.
 2019: Federal Personality of the year, received from Sheikh Nahyan bin Mubarak Al Nahyan.

Publications 

 Ramsay D, Aragon G, Almansouri H, Bashir S, Borum M. Strongyloides and Elevated Liver Associated Enzymes: An Infection Presenting 16 Years Following Immigration from an Endemic Area: 850. American Journal of Gastroenterology. 2009 Oct 1;104:S313.
 Khosla S, Almansouri H, Korshak L, Sheriff H, Aiken M, Himmerick K, Namata-Elengwe I, Kheirbek R, Nylen E, Kokkinos P. Effects of Lifestyle Intervention for Veterans (LIVe) Program on Cardiometabolic Parameters in African American Veterans With Type 2 Diabetes Mellitus. InDIABETES 2013 Jul 1 (Vol. 62, pp. A632-A632). 1701 N BEAUREGARD ST, ALEXANDRIA, VA 22311-1717 USA: AMER DIABETES ASSOC.

References

External links 
H.E. Dr. Hawaa Al Thahak Almansoori, SALT Speaker Profile

Emirati politicians
Emirati businesspeople
Emirate of Abu Dhabi
Emirati women in politics
Invention awards
Healthcare company founders
Year of birth missing (living people)
Living people
Emirati women scientists
Emirati inventors